Princess Maria Theresa of Löwenstein-Wertheim-Rosenberg (German: Maria Theresa, Prinzessin von Löwenstein-Wertheim-Rosenberg) (4 January 1870, Rome, Papal States – 17 January 1935, Vienna, Federal State of Austria) was a Princess of Löwenstein-Wertheim-Rosenberg and a member of the House of Löwenstein-Wertheim-Rosenberg by birth and an Infanta of Portugal, Duchess consort of Braganza, and titular queen consort of Portugal through her marriage to Miguel Januário, Duke of Braganza, Miguelist claimant to the throne of Portugal from 1866 to 1920.

Family
Maria Theresa was the fifth child and fourth daughter of Charles, Prince of Löwenstein-Wertheim-Rosenberg, brother of titular queen consort of Portugal Adelaide of Löwenstein-Wertheim-Rosenberg, and his wife Princess Sophie of Liechtenstein. Maria Theresa was an elder sister of Aloys, Prince of Löwenstein-Wertheim-Rosenberg.

Marriage and issue
Maria Theresa married her first cousin Miguel, Duke of Braganza, only son and second eldest child of former King Miguel of Portugal and his wife Adelaide of Löwenstein-Wertheim-Rosenberg, on 8 November 1893 in Kleinheubach, Kingdom of Bavaria. Maria Theresa and Miguel had eight children:

 Dona Isabel Maria de Bragança (1894–1970), married Franz Joseph, 9th Prince of Thurn and Taxis and had issue
 Dona Maria Benedita de Bragança (1896–1971), died unmarried and without issue
 Dona Mafalda de Bragança (1898–1918), died unmarried and without issue
 Dona Maria Ana of Braganza (1899–1971), married Karl August, 10th Prince of Thurn and Taxis and had issue
 Dona Maria Antónia of Braganza (1903–1973), married Sidney Ashley Chanler (son of William Astor Chanler) and had issue
 Dona Filipa de Bragança (1905–1990), died unmarried and without issue
 Dom Duarte Nuno, Duke of Braganza (1907–1976), married Dona Maria Francisca of Orléans and Braganza and had issue
 Dona Maria Adelaide de Bragança (1912–2012), married Nicolaas van Uden and had issue

Ancestry

References

1870 births
1935 deaths
House of Löwenstein-Wertheim-Rosenberg
Portuguese infantas
House of Braganza
Nobility from Rome
Princesses of Löwenstein-Wertheim-Rosenberg
Duchesses of Braganza
Dames of the Order of Saint Isabel